Francisco José D'Ângelo Pinto (born 11 February 1953) more commonly known as Chico d'Ângelo is a Brazilian politician as well as being a medic and professor. He has spent his political career representing Rio de Janeiro, having served as state representative since 2007.

Personal life
D'Ângelo was born to Francisco José Pinto Filho and Hélia Maciel D'Angelo Pinto . Before he became a politician D'Ângelo worked as a medic and professor.

Political career
D'Ângelo voted against of the impeachment motion of then-president Dilma Rousseff. D'Ângelo voted in favor of a corruption investigation into then speaker of the house Eduardo Cunha. He voted in opposition to the 2017 Brazilian labor reforms.

References

1953 births
Living people
People from Campos dos Goytacazes
Brazilian physicians
Brazilian educators
Democratic Labour Party (Brazil) politicians
Members of the Chamber of Deputies (Brazil) from Rio de Janeiro (state)